G Diaries is a Philippine travel and lifestyle television program created by ABS-CBN Foundation. It features destinations throughout the Philippines for an effort to support ecotourism. The program debuted on ABS-CBN on June 10, 2017, as part of special programming, until it became a regular TV show in later seasons. Gina Lopez served as the main host until her death in August 2019. Ernie Lopez took over the hosting duties onwards.

The program stopped broadcasting on ABS-CBN after the network ceased its free-to-air broadcast operations as ordered by the National Telecommunications Commission (NTC) and Solicitor General Jose Calida. The program later returned on Kapamilya Channel, with Michelle Lopez joining as co-host.
However, the show aired its final episode on March 27, 2022, and past episodes started on April 3.

Host
 Gina Lopez 
 Ernie Lopez 
 Michelle Lopez

Accolades

See also
List of ABS-CBN specials aired

References

External links

ABS-CBN television specials
Philippine travel television series
Philippine documentary television series
2017 Philippine television series debuts
2022 Philippine television series endings
Filipino-language television shows